Mykolaiv Raion ("Mykolaiv District") may refer to:

 Mykolaiv Raion, Lviv Oblast, abolished raion in western Ukraine
 Mykolaiv Raion, Mykolaiv Oblast, southern Ukraine
 Vitovka Raion, known as Mykolaiv Raion between 1939 and 1944, southern Ukraine.

See also
 Mykolaiv (disambiguation)